The Yellowstone National Park silver dollar is a commemorative coin issued by the United States Mint in 1999. Proceeds benefitted Yellowstone National Park and other national parks via the National Park Foundation.

Legislation
The United States Commemorative Coin Act of 1996 authorized the production of a commemorative silver dollar to commemorate the 125th anniversary of the establishment of Yellowstone National Park, the nation's first. The act allowed the coins to be struck in both proof and uncirculated finishes. The coins were first released on July 16, 1999.

Design
The obverse of the Yellowstone National Park commemorative dollar, designed by Edgar Z. Steever, IV, depicts a spouting geyser with the park's tree-lined landscape in the background. The reverse, designed by William C. Cousins, is adapted from the seal of the U.S. Department of Interior and shows an American Buffalo on the plains with a sun rising above the mountains in the background.

Specifications
 Display Box Color: Dark Green
 Edge: Reeded
 Weight: 26.730 grams; 0.8594 troy ounce
 Diameter: 38.10 millimeters; 1.500 inches
 Composition: 90% Silver, 10% Copper

See also

 List of United States commemorative coins and medals (1990s)
 United States commemorative coins
 United States Commemorative Coin Act of 1996

References

1999 establishments in the United States
Modern United States commemorative coins
Yellowstone National Park